Highgate (South) Aerodrome  was located  south of Highgate, Ontario, Canada.

References

Defunct airports in Ontario